Pukka, an adulatory slang adjective, may refer to:

Arts
Pukka Orchestra, a Canadian new wave band in the 1980s
Pukka or pucca, a category of Indian vernacular architecture

Brands
Pukka Pies, a United Kingdom foods manufacturer
Pukka Herbs, an Ayurvedic herbal remedies company
Pukka Electric MiniBike, a small, battery-powered vehicle

Individuals
Erkki Pukka, Finnish 1960s ski jumper
Mikko Pukka, Finnish ice hockey defenceman
Pukka, racehorse who won the 1925 Hobart Cup in Tasmania

See also
Pucca (disambiguation)
Puka (disambiguation)
 Pukka sahib, an Indian term for British civil servants

Hindi words and phrases
Indian words and phrases